Golyama Brestnitsa is a small village in Yablanitsa Municipality, Lovech Province, northern Bulgaria. About 150 live here but some houses are holiday homes or for rental, making the village busier at weekends and during school holidays.

Geography 
Golyama Brestnitsa lies in a hilly country facing the Danubian Plain to the north and the foothills of the Balkan Mountains to the south. From the Danchova Mogila hill near the village there is a panoramic view to the Balkan peaks of Dragoitsa, Lisets, Vasilyov and Vezhen to the south.

The village is located at 105 km north-east of the national capital Sofia via the A2 Hemus motorway and at 55 km of the city of Lovech. There is a daily bus service to the village of Zlatna Panega and the municipal centre Yablanitsa (6 km away), from where there are buses to Sofia or Varna daily.

Economy 
The main employer is the Titan Cement Factory in Zlatna Panga. The village has a lively café/pub/shop and square, picnic area, town hall, post office, church and four B&B accommodations (guest house rooms and villa rental).

Citations 

Villages in Lovech Province